The Central Arkansas Bears and Sugar Bears represent the University of Central Arkansas (UCA) in NCAA Division I's Football Championship Subdivision (formerly I-AA football) as a member of the ASUN Conference. The athletic program is supported by the efforts of a diverse group of over 400 male and female student-athletes. Its men's teams are called the Bears and the women's are the Sugar Bears.

UCA joined the ASUN in July 2021 after having been a member of the Southland Conference. While the ASUN does not currently sponsor football, it has committed to launching an FCS football league in the near future. Until ASUN football is established, UCA is a de facto associate member of the Western Athletic Conference (WAC), competing in a football partnership between the two leagues officially branded as the "ASUN–WAC Challenge".

Sports sponsored

Gulf South Conference to Southland Conference
From 1993 to 2006, UCA competed in the West Division of the Gulf South Conference. In 2005–2006, UCA's men's athletic teams won that conference's All Sports Trophy. However, on July 1, 2006, UCA began the transition to Division I and joined the Southland Conference, with the Bears also becoming Associate members of the Missouri Valley Conference for men's soccer. 
In 2008, the UCA Bear Football Team defeated more Southland Conference opponents than any other conference team and were declared "Unofficial Southland Conference Champions." (Neither the Southland Conference nor the NCAA would recognize UCA as the champions due to the transition period from Division II.)

NAIA 
Prior to moving to Division II, UCA competed in NAIA Division I for most sports, winning the national football championship three times (1984 {co-champs}, 1985 {co-champs} and 1991) and finishing runner-up once (1976). Between 1979 and 1992, UCA won or shared 13 out of 14 Arkansas Intercollegiate Conference championships (AIC) and went to the playoffs 12 times in that span. A number of former Bears have found success in the NFL, including Tom McConnaughey, Jacob Ford, Landon Trusty, Willie Davis, Tyree Davis, Dave Burnette, Curtis Burrow, Andre Collins, David Evans, and most notably Monte Coleman.

Scottie Pippen 
Former National Basketball Association player Scottie Pippen played basketball at Central Arkansas. Pippen was drafted by the Seattle SuperSonics with the fifth pick in the 1987 NBA draft, and then traded to the Chicago Bulls for Olden Polynice. Pippen won six NBA championships (1991–1993 and 1996–1998) while playing for the Bulls (1987–1998). While still an active player, Pippen was voted as one of the NBA's Top 50 Players of All-Time, and the Chicago Bulls retired his jersey number (#33). His jersey at UCA is also retired, and hangs in the rafters. Pippen also played for the Houston Rockets (1998–1999) and the Portland Trail Blazers (1999–2003). Pippen is retired, and lives with his family in Fort Lauderdale, Florida; his son Scotty Jr. currently plays college basketball at Vanderbilt.

References

External links